The execution of Thai royalty (th: การสำเร็จโทษด้วยท่อนจันทน์; RTGS: kan samret thot duai thon chan; the act of executing royalty by using a sandalwood cudgel) was the process of executing Thai royalty by means of one sandalwood cudgel or more upon his or her neck or stomach. It was the ceremony most frequently performed in Thai history from the Ayutthaya period to the initial period of Rattanakosin. This kind of execution has not been performed since the reign of King Mongkut, and has officially been abolished by the first Criminal Code of Thailand promulgated in 1881 by King Chulalongkorn.

Nidhi Eoseewong, a renowned Thai academician, gave an opinion that: "I don't know how to translate this magnificently elegant ceremony of executing royalty into any foreign language. In English there exists a term derived from Latin, 'regicide', the literal meaning of which is an act of killing a monarch. The foreigner uses this word in such direct meaning, namely, knifing a monarch to death as being on a par with an act of Macbeth, or decapitating a monarch with guillotine which is not a royal guillotine as it can be used for every kinds of person from prostitute to royalty...therefore, the Thai style of executing a monarch can daze and dumbfound foreigners (and the Thai people who do not understand the Thai history). The execution of Thai royalty is not like that of the foreigner."

History
There existed in Section 176 of the Palace Laws under the Three Seals Law, King Phutthayotfachulalok's Revision Edition, that:

The time this Palace Law was first promulgated is a matter of controversy in the contemporary Thai academic circle. However, there appeared on the first page of the oldest Palace Law that:

The era appearing in the above page is the Chunlasakkarat (CS), which was commenced by King Anawrahta of Myanmar and was popularly used in South Asian countries in older times.

Poramin Khrueathong (th: ปรามินทร์ เครือทอง), a Thai independent academician whom wrote the book "Samret thot duai thon chan" (th: สำเร็จโทษด้วยท่อนจันทน์; 'Execution by sandalwood cudgel'), has examined all royal Thai chronicles and revealed that the year King Borommatrailokkanat accessed to the throne has been recorded differently as follows:

1. The Royal Thai Chronicle, Bradley Edition : CS 796 (1434);

2. The Royal Thai Chronicle, Royal Rescript Edition : CS 796 (1434);

3. The Royal Thai Chronicle, Luang Prasoet-asksonnit Edition : CS 810 (1448), the Year of Dragon.

Prince Damrong Rajanubhab, who is now credited as Father of the Thai history, has stated that: "I believe that the Era as recorded in the Royal Thai Chronicle, Luang Prasoet-asksonnit Edition, was correct." In this case, the era in such Chronicle was CS 720, for which was before the accession of King Borommatrailokkanat for ninety year (CS 810); the Prince replied to this case that it should be the royal recorder's mistake as he might write the number "๘" (8) as "๗" (7), the correct era should be CS 820. However, according to the standard calendar, CS 820 was the Year of Dog; the Year of the Rat should be CS 722.

Offences liable to this execution

References and notes

Legal history of Thailand
Thai culture
Capital punishment in Thailand
Cultural history of Thailand
Thai royalty